The 2017–18 Idaho State Bengals women's basketball team represents Idaho State University during the 2017–18 NCAA Division I women's basketball season. The Bengals, led by tenth year head coach Seton Sobolewski, play their home games at Reed Gym. They were members of the Big Sky Conference. They finished the season 21–11, 11–7 in Big Sky play to finish in a tie for fifth place. They advanced to the semifinals of the Big Sky women's tournament where they lost to Northern Colorado. Despite having 21 wins and a better record, they were not invited to a postseason tournament for the 2nd year in a row.

Roster

Schedule

|-
!colspan=9 style="background:#; color:#000000;"| Exhibition

|-
!colspan=9 style="background:#; color:#000000;"| Non-conference regular season

|-
!colspan=9 style="background:#; color:#000000;"| Big Sky regular season

|-
!colspan=9 style="background:#; color:#000000;"| Big Sky Women's Tournament

See also
2017–18 Idaho State Bengals men's basketball team

References

Idaho State Bengals women's basketball seasons
Idaho State